Eagle in a Cage is an Anglo-American historical drama film, produced in 1972.

Plot summary
After his defeat at the Battle of Waterloo and surrender to the British Empire, Napoleon Bonaparte is delivered into exile and imprisonment on St. Helena, setting the scene for a psychological character study of the fallen Emperor and those upon the island with him as he rakes over the ashes of his career. After a failed escape attempt, the British Government offers him a chance for a return to limited power in France once again as a buffer against instability there; however, on the point of departure he is afflicted by the symptoms of stomach cancer and the offer is in consequence withdrawn, leaving him entrapped on the island and exiting history's stage.

Cast
Kenneth Haigh as Napoleon Bonaparte
John Gielgud as Lord Sissal
Ralph Richardson as Sir Hudson Lowe
Billie Whitelaw as Madame Bertrand
Moses Gunn as General Gaspard Gourgaud
Ferdy Mayne as Count Henri Gatien Bertrand
Lee Montague as Cipriani
Georgina Hale as Betsy Balcombe
Michael Williams as Barry Edward O'Meara
Hugh Armstrong as British soldier
Athol Coats as Sentry

See also
 List of American films of 1972

External links

1972 films
Films about Napoleon
Films set on Saint Helena
Films set in the 1810s
Films set in the 1820s
Films based on television plays
American historical drama films
1970s historical drama films
Films scored by Marc Wilkinson
1972 drama films
1970s English-language films
Films directed by Fielder Cook
1970s American films